Redpath is a small village located between the larger settlements of Earlston,  to the north, and St Boswells,  to the south, in the historic county of Berwickshire within the Scottish Borders. The Leader Water runs past the west end of the village.

Gallery

See also
List of places in the Scottish Borders
List of places in Scotland

References

Villages in the Scottish Borders